William Thomas Belden (born January 5, 1949) is an American former rower. He competed in the men's double sculls event at the 1976 Summer Olympics.

References

External links
 

1949 births
Living people
American male rowers
Olympic rowers of the United States
Rowers at the 1976 Summer Olympics
Pan American Games medalists in rowing
Pan American Games gold medalists for the United States
Rowers at the 1999 Pan American Games
Sportspeople from Washington, D.C.
Medalists at the 1999 Pan American Games